Institute of Aeronautical Engineering (IARE) is a private engineering college in Hyderabad. The college offers post graduate (Masters) and undergraduate (Bachelors) courses in engineering and technology. 

The college is located near Air Force Station, Dundigal in Hyderabad. It was established in 2000. Institute of Aeronautical Engineering is affiliated to Jawaharlal Nehru Technological University, Hyderabad and approved by AICTE.

Degrees
 Bachelor of Engineering
 Aeronautical Engineering
 Mechanical Engineering
 Civil engineering
 Computer Science and Engineering
 Electronics and Communication Engineering
 Electrical and Electronics Engineering
 Information Technology
 Computer Science and Engineering (Artificial Intelligence and Machine Learning)
 Computer Science and Engineering (Data Science)
 Computer Science and Engineering (Cyber Security)
 Computer Science and Information Technology
 Master of Business Administration
 M.Tech (Aerospace Engineering)
 M.Tech (CAD/CAM (Mechanical Engineering)
 M.Tech (Computer Science and Engineering)
 M.Tech (Embedded Systems)
 M.Tech (Electrical Power Systems)
 M.Tech (Structural Engineering)

Departments
Chemistry/Environmental Science Department
English Department
Mathematics Department
Managerial Science Department
Computer Programming Department
Physics Department

Rankings and affiliations

The National Institutional Ranking Framework (NIRF) ranked it 159 among engineering colleges in 2021. Institute of Aeronautical Engineering is affiliated to Jawaharlal Nehru Technological University, Hyderabad and approved by AICTE. It is also recognised by the University Grants Commission (UGC).

Sports
The college has a playground of two acres. It offers facilities for outdoor and indoor games such as cricket, football, volleyball, basketball, badminton and table tennis and chess.

See also 
Education in India
Literacy in India
List of institutions of higher education in Telangana

References

External links

Engineering colleges in Hyderabad, India
2000 establishments in Andhra Pradesh
Educational institutions established in 2000